The Copenhagen Open was a men's tennis tournament on the World Championship Tennis (WCT) circuit and ATP Tour held in Copenhagen, Denmark. It was first held in February 1973 as part of the WCT tour and featured renowned players such as Ken Rosewall, Fred Stolle, Arthur Ashe and Tom Okker. It was played indoors on a carpet surface.

The tournament was not held the following two years but returned on the calendar in 1976 without any of the first-tier players. After 1976 the tournament was discontinued. It was re-introduced in 1991 as part of the ATP Tour and was halted again in 2003. The only player to win the Copenhagen Open more than once was Magnus Gustafsson (1998, 1999). The only Danish winner was Lars Elvstrøm.

Finals

Singles

Doubles

References

 
ATP Tour
Carpet court tennis tournaments
Hard court tennis tournaments
Indoor tennis tournaments
International sports competitions in Copenhagen
Tennis tournaments in Denmark
Defunct tennis tournaments in Europe
Defunct sports competitions in Denmark
1973 establishments in Denmark
Recurring sporting events established in 1973
Recurring sporting events disestablished in 2003
2003 disestablishments in Denmark